The battle of Morvedre (1412) was an armed confrontation between supporters of Ferdinand of Antequera and James II of Urgell that occurred in the Kingdom of Valencia during the interregnum in the Crown of Aragon after the death of Martin I.

The battle
Valencian troops favorable to James II of Urgell, headed by the governor of Valencia Arnau Guillem de Bellera, advanced towards Morella to face the trastamarists. But in Sagunto met an army of Castile, Aragon and valencian pro-Fernando led by Diego Gomez de Sandoval.

In the battle killed 2000 or 3000 people, among whom was Bellera. The victory of the troops of Ferdinand settled trastamarist's control in the Kingdom of Valencia.

References

1412 in Europe
Morvedre
15th century in Aragon
Morvedre